is a Japanese guitarist, composer, arranger and the former member of the J-pop band Garnet Crow in years 1999 to 2013, as well as some of his own solo releases.

Biography
Since the release of Okamoto's 2010 solo album "Now Printing...", he has used the stage name "Super Light" for his solo projects. As a solo artist, Okamoto writes the majority of his songs by himself, however, fellow Garnet Crow member Nana Azuki has written lyrics for some of his songs. Okamoto is sometimes referred to with the nickname "Okamocchi" (おかもっち). He has created an alternate version of the "GARNET CROW" songs "Crystal Gauge" and "Mysterious Eyes", the latter of which Okamoto had released under the "Super Light" name.
During live performances as a solo artist, Okamoto sometimes plays "Garnet Crow" songs, or even invites the other Garnet members to appear as guest musicians. In "Garnet Crow" live performances, Okamoto provides back-up vocals in addition to playing the guitar.

From 2002 until 2009 he was the host of the radio show "Pastime Paradise", which was regularly broadcast on Sunday on the Japanese radio station Alpha Station (FM Kyoto 89.4). In years 2004-2006 he occasionally performed as the lead singer in THURSDAY LIVE at hills Pan Koujou "Okamoto Night" where he sang his own solo and Garnet Crow songs. In years 2010-2013 he formed with the vocalist and composer of Garnet Crow, Yuri Nakamura subgroup "MINIQLO". They released four mini studio albums which were sold in limited copies, during their live performances. The albums consist of re-arranged songs from their previously release studio albums.

After disband of the band, he regularly appeared in live performances of Doa and Zard as guest musicians and sometimes provided music compositions for several Giza Studio artists.

Discography

Studio albums

Singles

Digital singles

Compilations album

Live DVD

List of provided works

Composer and arranger
Band-Maid: Before Yesterday, Time
Grram: Kimi ja Nai! Watashi ja Nai!, Sora no you na hito
Mai Kuraki: P.S My Sunshine, Juliet, Zutto...
Aiko Kitahara: Haru Saku Michi
Hayami Kishimoto: Air Mail..., Telepathy, reigning star
Aya Kamiki: Just take my heart, Are you happy now?, It's a beautiful day, I'm your side, Whenever you're gone Today, Yakusoku no Basho de, 
Azumi Uehara: Marmalade Love
Zard: Hypnosis
Uura Saeka: Kimi ga Ita, Genzai Shinkoukei
WAR-ED: Ikitakutemo Ikirarenai Seimei, Underworld

Composer
Aya Kamiki: A constellation, Ever so Sweet
Shiori Takei: Yuunagi
Akane Sugazaki: Boyfriend, La la la ~ Yume wo Mitsumeta made~, Itsumademo Zutto
Aiko Kitahara: Cobalt blue
Uura Saeka: Koko janai Basho de
Qyoto: Taiyou mo Hitoribocchi, I'm a Loser

Arranger
Marie Ueda: Saphire, 210Go, Ookami Shounen
Aika Ohno: Egao de Iyouyo
WAR-ED: Mou Ichido Kangaeyou, Owaranai Monogatari, Tatakawanai Sekai ni Ima Hana ga Saku
Aya Kamiki: Sunday Morning, Summer Memories, Kimi Sarishi Yuuwaku
Hayami Kishimoto: Domino
Miho Komatsu: Sun and moon, Sha la la, Tokubetsu ni Naru hi, Oozora he, Itsuka wa Dial no Koi, Himawari no Komichi, Haru no Kioku
Saasa: Darling -Summer-, Dramatical, My Hero,
Shiori Takei: Sleep
Mai Kuraki: Tell me what, I promise
Natsuiro: Sayonara Precious
Ai Takaoka: Kokoro wo Tsunaide, Forever my friend, Omoide no Natsu ga Kuru, Kimi no Egao wo Miru to Ureshiku naru Kimi no Namida wo Miru to Setsunaku naru, Anata no Kokoro Haremasuyouni
grram: Kanashii Hodo Kyou no Yuuhi Kirei da ne, Taisetsu Mono wa Kitto
Nilo Koizumi: Chuushinbu
d-project: Yureru Omoi
Zard: Sunao ni Ienakute
Chicago Poodle: Naitara ee
Shiho: Junction
Sparkling Point: Key Room Sky
Hatchi/Hatch: Usotsuki wa Daikirai, Ai, Yume no Izumi
PINC INC: Kimi no Ichiban ni Naritai, Shuumatsu Daikirai
Moca: Tobenai Sora
Yuki Okazaki: Desperado

Magazine appearances
From J-Groove Magazine:
December 2000 Vol.2
June 2001 Vol.8
May 2002 Vol.19

From Music Freak Magazine:
November 2000 Vol.72: First Fine Day Interview
June 2001 Vol.79: Sweet×2 Summer Rain Interview
March 2002 Vol.88: Album A first fine day self liner notes
February 2003 Vol.99: Okamoto Hitoshi Player's rhapsody (short preview)
October 2004 Vol.119: Release information
November 2004 Vol.120: FF/REWIND Interview

References

External links
Official Website Super Light
Hitoshi Okamoto Oricon Profile
Garnet Crow Official Website
Hitoshi Okamoto Musing Profile

1976 births
Being Inc. artists
Japanese composers
Japanese guitarists
Japanese male composers
Garnet Crow
Living people